Brake Lights is the ninth mixtape by West Coast rapper Game released as a free online download on August 3, 2010. The mixtape is hosted by DJ Skee. The mixtape includes all new tracks and was released in promotion to Game's upcoming album The R.E.D. Album. Production is handled by DJ Khalil, Cool & Dre, DJ Toomp, Lex Luger, J.R. Rotem and more. Features on the mixtape include Snoop Dogg, Busta Rhymes, Rick Ross, Nas, Akon, T.I., Robin Thicke, Shawty Lo, Yung Joc, Waka Flocka Flame and more.

On the title of the mixtape, DJ Skee said "Reason we named it Brake Lights is because it's something you don't see if you're following us often — we don't stop."

Brake Lights was premiered by XXL at midnight on August 3, 2010. The mixtape was met with generally positive reviews from Miami New Times, Los Angeles Times and HipHopDX.

Track listing

Sample credits

"Trading Places" recycles "Almost Famous" by Eminem
"MIA (3 Heats)" samples "Time" by Lou Rawls
"Stop" samples "Mr. Crowley" by Ozzy Osbourne
"Street Riders" recycles "Hustla" by Triple C's featuring Masspike Miles
"HaHaHaHaHa" samples "What's Beef?" by the Notorious B.I.G.
"Pushin' It" recycles "Pushin' It" by Ja Rule featuring Robin Thicke
"Do It B.I.G." samples "Juicy" by the Notorious B.I.G.
"You Are the Blood" samples "You Are the Blood" by Sufjan Stevens
"Cherry Kool-Aid" samples "Am I a Good Man" by Them Two
"Heels & Dresses" samples "The Robot With Human Hair, Pt. 1" by Dance Gavin Dance
"Blackout" samples "No Easy Way Out" by Robert Tepper
"Hustlin' (Champion's Anthem)" recycles "Let Me In" by Pill

References 

The Game (rapper) albums
2010 mixtape albums
Albums produced by DJ Toomp
Albums produced by Cool & Dre
Albums produced by Lex Luger
Albums produced by J. R. Rotem
Albums produced by DJ Khalil